The 1981 France rugby union tour of Australia was a series of matches played by the France national rugby union team in Australia in June 1981. The French team lost both their international matches against the Australia national rugby union team.

Matches
Scores and results list France's points tally first.

Touring party

Manager: 
Assistant Manager: 
Captain:

Full backs

Three-quarters

Half-backs

Forwards

Rugby union tours of Australia
France national rugby union team tours
History of rugby union matches between Australia and France
France rugby union tour of Australia
France rugby union tour of Australia
France rugby union tour of Australia